The ISO 14031:2013 Environmental management - Environmental Performance Evaluation – Guidelines gives guidance on the design and use of environmental performance evaluation, and on identification and selection of environmental performance indicators, for use by all organizations, regardless of type, size, location and complexity.

See also
 ISO 14000
 Sustainability accounting

14031
Economy and the environment
Environmental standards
Industrial ecology